Space Coast Credit Union (also known as SCCU) is a state-chartered credit union headquartered in Melbourne, Florida. It is insured and regulated by the National Credit Union Administration (NCUA). As of 2022, SCCU has over 560,000 members and $7.7 billion in assets, making it the third largest credit union in Florida.

History

SCCU was formed in 1951 as Patrick Air Force Base Credit Union, serving Patrick Air Force Base. The credit union started with $372 and 7 members.

The company changed its name to Space Coast Credit Union in 1980.

In 2009, SCCU merged with Eastern Financial Florida Credit Union, growing SCCU's assets to $3.2 billion and 380,000 members. Prior to the merger, bad loans and investments made during the 2007–2008 financial crisis put Eastern Financial into distress. NCUA took control of Eastern Financial and turned operations over to SCCU.

In 2011, SCCU spun off its Tampa Bay area operations to MidFlorida Credit Union, gaining MidFlorida 16,000 members, 6 branch locations, and $115 million in assets.

Alive Credit Union acquired two of SCCU's branches in Jacksonville in 2012.

Membership

Membership at SCCU is open to anyone who works or lives in one of 34 Florida counties: Alachua, Brevard, Broward, Charlotte, Citrus, Clay, Clay, Collier, Duval, Flagler, Hernando, Hillsborough, Indian River, Lake, Lee, Manatee, Marion, Martin, Miami-Dade, Monroe, Nassau, Okeechobee Orange, Osceola, Palm Beach, Pasco, Pinellas, Polk, Putnam, Sarasota, Seminole, St. Johns, St. Lucie, Sumter, or Volusia.

References

External links
 

Credit unions based in Florida
Banks established in 1951
1951 establishments in Florida
Companies based in Brevard County, Florida
Melbourne, Florida